380 Fiducia (prov. designation:  or ) is a dark and large asteroid, approximately  in diameter, located in the central region of the asteroid belt. It was discovered by French astronomer Auguste Charlois at the Nice Observatory on 8 January 1894. The carbonaceous C-type asteroid has a rotation period of 13.7 hours. It was named "Fiducia", the Latin word for confidence.

References

External links 
 Lightcurve plot of 380 Fiducia, Palmer Divide Observatory, B. D. Warner (2004)
 Lightcurve Database Query (LCDB), at www.minorplanet.info
 Dictionary of Minor Planet Names, Google books
 Asteroids and comets rotation curves, CdR – Geneva Observatory, Raoul Behrend
 Discovery Circumstances: Numbered Minor Planets (1)-(5000) – Minor Planet Center
 
 

000380
Discoveries by Auguste Charlois
Named minor planets
000380
18940108